Palachira  is a suburb of Varkala Town. It is situated 2.8km south of Varkala Town. The junction is situated in Cheruniyoor panchayat of Thiruvananthapuram district in the Indian state of Kerala.

References

Varkala